The 1951 Jordan League was the 7th season of Jordan League. Al-Ahli won its 4th title.

Overview
Al-Ahli won the championship.

References

RSSSF

External links
 Jordan Football Association website

Jordanian Pro League seasons
Jordan
Jordan
football